Petr Hořava (born July 22, 1985) is a Czech professional ice hockey defenceman. He was born in Kladno, and played for his local team HC Kladno the majority of his career. He comes from a sporting family; he has an older brother Miloslav Hořava (ice hockey, born 1982) who has also played hockey for a living for ages. His father Miloslav Hořava was also a defenceman, and played 80 games for the New York Rangers, and his brother, also named Miloslav played alongside him at HC Kladno. Petr played for various other Czech teams, he played with HC Oceláři Třinec in the Czech Extraliga during the 2010–11 Czech Extraliga season. In 2014 he signed for English side Milton Keynes Lightning

References

External links 
 
 

1985 births
Czech ice hockey defencemen
Rytíři Kladno players
HC Oceláři Třinec players
Living people
Sportspeople from Kladno
Czech expatriate sportspeople in England
Expatriate ice hockey players in England
Czech expatriate ice hockey people